Call Me from Afar is a 1977 Soviet drama film directed by German Lavrov and Stanislav Lyubshin.

Plot 
The film is about a young woman, Grusha Veselova, who was abandoned by her husband because she was stopping him from drinking, and now she is raising her son alone. But she has an older brother who decides to help her and introduces her to her friend.

Cast 
 Lidiya Fedoseeva-Shukshina as Grusha Veselova
 Stanislav Lyubshin as Vladimir Nikolayevich
 Mikhail Ulyanov as Nikolay
 Ivan Ryzhov as Savva
 Vladimir Naumenko as Vitya (as Voloda Naumenko)
 Oleg Novikov as Yura
 Tatyana Aleksandrova	
 Nikolai Brilling as Kuzma Yegorovich (as N. Brilling)
 Lidiya Dranovskaya
 Lyudmila Gamuryak as Olya

References

External links 
 

1977 films
1970s Russian-language films
Soviet drama films
1977 drama films